The Military ranks of East Timor are the military insignia used by the Timor Leste Defence Force. Being a former colony of Portugal, East Timor shares a rank structure similar to that of Portuguese Armed Forces.

Officers 
The rank insignia for commissioned officers for the army and navy respectively.

Enlisted 
The rank insignia for enlisted personnel for the army and navy respectively.

Gallery

References 

Ranks